Peter W. Bates is a professor of mathematics at Michigan State University.

Bates received his Ph.D. from the University of Utah in 1976.

In 2012, Bates became a fellow of the American Mathematical Society.

References

Year of birth missing (living people)
Living people
Fellows of the American Mathematical Society
20th-century American mathematicians
21st-century American mathematicians
University of Utah alumni
Michigan State University faculty
Place of birth missing (living people)
Latter Day Saints from Michigan
English Latter Day Saints